Brain-sur-Longuenée is a former commune in the Maine-et-Loire department in western France. On 28 December 2015, it was merged into the new commune Erdre-en-Anjou.

Population

See also
Communes of the Maine-et-Loire department

References

External links

Official site

Former communes of Maine-et-Loire